Canoeing competitions at the 2022 South American Games in Asuncion, Paraguay were held between October 11 and 14, 2022 at the Bahía de Asunción – Club Mbiguá and Canal de Piracema.

Schedule
The competition schedule is as follows:

Medal summary

Medal table

Medalists

Slalom
 Men

 Women

Sprint
Men

Women

Participation
Ten nations participated in canoeing events of the 2022 South American Games.

References

Canoeing
South American Games
2022